Malcolm Bernard Pein (born 14 August 1960) is a British chess player, chess organizer, author, and journalist. He holds the title of International Master.

Chess biography
Pein earned the title of International Master (IM) in 1986. Pein has been a minor influence in British chess for over thirty years, in the roles of player, coach, journalist, publisher, organizer, fundraiser, and entrepreneur.

Pein won his first tournament in 1965 and was British Junior Champion in 1977. His most notable victories in tournament play include Jon Speelman, Vishy Anand and Lev Psakhis.

In June 1992 he purchased Chess & Bridge Limited and set up a chess shop on the Euston Road in London which was relocated to Baker Street in 2010.

In 1997 Pein was appointed as a consultant to IBM for the iconic Kasparov vs Deep Blue match. He was appointed Match Director for the Brains in Bahrain match between Vladimir Kramnik and the computer program Fritz in 2002. Pein was used as the ‘voice’ of the program in Version 5.32.

In 2009, Pein devised, fundraised, and organized the London Chess Classic, the UK's first world-class elite all-play-all tournament since the Phillips & Drew GLC Chess Challenge of 1986, and was the strongest UK chess tournament by rating to date. The tournament was run annually up to 2019, with the 2020 tournament cancelled due to the COVID-19 pandemic.

In 2010, Malcolm Pein founded Chess in Schools and Communities, a UK-registered charity whose aim is to improve children’s educational outcomes and social development by introducing them to the game of chess. Malcolm has been the charity's CEO since inception, and by the end of 2020 the charity has taught the game to over 250,000 children.

Malcolm Pein's journalistic career started with spells as the chess correspondent for the short-lived Today and The European newspapers. Pein started writing reports for The Daily Telegraph in 1987 before becoming their full-time correspondent in 1988. Pein has written a daily chess column every day for the 33 years, over 11,0000 columns in total. He is also the owner and executive editor of CHESS magazine, a monthly publication with an international readership.

Malcolm also consulted and devised chess sequences for numerous television and film productions with a chess theme. Including X-Men and Holby City, the Apple TV Series Slow Horses and a docudrama produce by ARTE on the 1997 Kasparov vs Deep Blue match entitled Rematch. 

Pein is also the representative to FIDE for the English Chess Federation (ECF) and in October 2015 was elected as ECF's International Director. In 2018, Malcolm Pein stood for election as FIDE Deputy President on Georgios Makropoulos' ticket but was unsuccessful. Malcolm Pein told Chess.com he "would be interested" in running for president in the 2022 FIDE Elections.

Malcolm has been the captain of the England Open team since October 2015, with the team enjoying notable successes at the 2016 Olympiad in Baku against China and Azerbaijan.  Pein captained England to a bronze medal finish at the 2019 European Team Chess Championships in Batumi, Georgia.

Books
In addition to his newspaper columns and magazine editorial, Pein has written a number of chess books and booklets, including:
 Grunfeld Defence (Batsford, 1981) – 
Trends in Spanish Marshall (Trends Publications, 1990) – 
 Blumenfeld Gambit [with Jan Przewoznik] (Everyman, 1991) – 
Bobby Fischer: The $5,000,000 Comeback [with Nigel Davies and Jonathan Levitt] (Cadogan, 1992) – 
 Daily Telegraph Guide to Chess (Batsford, 1995) – 
 The Exchange Grunfeld [with Adrian Mikhalchishin] (Everyman, 1996) –

Example game

Malcolm Pein vs. GM Vladimir Bagirov, Zehlendorf-HSK II 1995: 
1.Nf3 d5 2.c4 c6 3.d4 e6 4.Nc3 dxc4 5.Bg5 f6 6.Bf4 b5 7.e4 Bb7 8.Be2 Ne7 9.h4 Ng6 10.Bg3 Be7 11.h5 Nf8 12.Qc2 Na6 13.Rd1 Qa5 14.h6 g6 15.0-0 Rd8 16.Rfe1 Kf7 17.a3 Rg8 (see diagram) 18.d5 cxd5 19.exd5 Bxd5 20.Nd4 Qb6 21.Ndxb5 Rd7 22.Nxd5 Rxd5 23.Rxd5 exd5 24.Bxc4 Qc5 25.Rxe7 Kxe7 26.Bd6 Qxd6 27.Nxd6 Nc7 28.Nb5 Nfe6 29.Nxc7 1–0

References

External links
 
 The Daily Telegraph The Daily Telegraph chess articles
 https://archive.today/20130411064316/http://new.livestream.com/WorldChess/Round1
 

1960 births
Living people
English chess players
British chess writers
Sportspeople from Liverpool
Chess International Masters